Săgeata Stadium is a multi-purpose stadium in Stejaru, Romania.  It is currently used mostly for football matches and is the home ground of Săgeata Stejaru.  The stadium holds 3,000 people.

Football venues in Romania
Multi-purpose stadiums in Romania